The Office of Alcohol and Tobacco Control is a Louisiana state government agency that regulates the alcoholic beverage and tobacco industries. The Office places emphasis on combating underage purchasing and drinking of alcohol and tobacco.

The current Commissioner of the Office of Alcohol and Tobacco Control is Juana Marine-Lombard who was appointed on December 16, 2015, by Governor John Bel Edwards.

References

External links
 

State alcohol agencies of the United States
State law enforcement agencies of Louisiana